Žabnica may refer to: 

In Croatia:
Žabnica, Croatia, a village in Zagreb County

In Slovenia:
Žabnica, Kranj, a settlement in the Municipality of Kranj
Žabnica, Brezovica, a settlement in the Municipality of Brezovica